In structural geology, a roof pendant, also known as a pendant, is a mass of country rock that projects downward into and is entirely surrounded by an igneous intrusion such as a batholith or other pluton. In lay terminology sometimes "rock hat" is used. A roof pendant is an erosional remnant that was created by the removal of the overlying country rock that formed the roof of the igneous intrusion that encloses it. If this downward protruding mass of roof rock still has a connection to the main, surrounding mass of country rock, they are known by structural geologists as either septa or screens. Roof pendants typically have been strongly metamorphosed through the processes of contact metamorphism.

A classic, well-documented example of a roof pendant is the strata that comprise Mount Morrison within the Sierra Nevada in Mono and Fresno counties, California. It lies midway between Mono Lake on the north and Bishop, California, on the south. This roof pendant consists of a  15,000 m- (50,000 ft-) thick sequence of complexly folded and faulted metasedimentary strata and metavolcanic strata. The eastern two-thirds of this roof pendant consists of Cambrian to Silurian and Pennsylvanian to Permian metasedimentary strata. Metavolcanic rocks of Mesozoic age comprise the western third of the roof pendant. Mesozoic granitic rocks enclose and intrude the pendant rocks. These granitic rocks consist predominantly of quartz monzonite and granodiorite with local, minor, scattered bodies of granite, aplite, diorite and gabbro. These pendants are part of a discontinuous, -long, northwest-trending belt of roof pendants that are preserved within the granitic plutons of Sierra Nevada.

References

See also
Xenolith

Igneous intrusions